Berģi is a neighbourhood of Riga, the capital of Latvia.

The Ethnographic Open-Air Museum is located here.

Neighbourhoods in Riga